The Udine–Trieste railway is an Italian state railway line that connects Udine and Trieste running through the central and eastern part of Friuli Venezia Giulia.
 
The whole line is double track and electrified at 3000 Volts DC.
 
The railway infrastructure is managed by the Rete Ferroviaria Italiana, which classifies it as one of its primary lines, while both regional and long-distance passenger traffic is managed by Trenitalia. The railway is used by the freight trains of various railway companies.

History 

 
The line dates back to the times of the Austrian Empire, because its government wanted to connect its capital of Vienna with the Kingdom of Lombardy–Venetia.
 
The Vienna–Trieste (Südbahn) and Venice–Trieste (Ferdinandsbahn) lines were completed in 1857.
 
The Udine–Trieste railway, opened in 1860, ran from Aurisina (later called Nabresina) near Trieste to Udine. The western section of the Venice–Udine railway between Udine and Casarsa, including the bridge over the Tagliamento, was opened at the same time.
 
In 1866, after Lombardy had been annexed to the Kingdom of Sardinia, Veneto was also annexed to the Kingdom of Italy following the Austro-Prussian War. The line thus became an international railway and Cormons station became a border station. The whole line became Italian In 1918.
 

References

Notes

Footnotes

Sources
 
 
 

Railway lines in Friuli-Venezia Giulia
1860 establishments in the Austrian Empire
Railway lines opened in 1860